Proctor Academy is a coeducational, independent preparatory boarding school for grades 9–12 located on  in Andover, New Hampshire. There are about 370 students.

History

Origin
Proctor Academy first began as Andover Academy, established in 1848 by the town of Andover. The idea of the school spawned from a sewing group conversation between the wives of the area's prominent families, in the living room of attorney Samuel Butterfield. The women shared a strong conviction that their town needed a school for its expanding population. On June 23, 1848, the incorporation of the academy was approved, with Samuel Butterfield as president, Walcott Hamlin as secretary, and True Brown and John Fellows as executive committee members.

The academy opened its doors in August 1848, on the second floor of the church on Main Street, with many of the desks, chairs and chalkboards donated by the Butterfields. Mrs. Eliza Butterfield set up the curriculum with Dyer H. Sanborn as the principal and Miss Eliza Wingate as "preceptress". The first term had 43 girls and 65 boys enrolled, but within four years the school had grown to just over 250 students.

The school year was set up into four terms of twelve weeks each. The tuition rate, per quarter, was:

 $3.00 for common classes
 $3.50 for higher English, and Languages
 $1.00 to $3.00 for Drawing and Painting
 $1.00 to $3.00 for Needlework
 $2.00 for Music
 $8.00 for Students with incidental expenses

The curriculum the first year included English, Latin, Greek Literature, Mathematics, Morals, Natural and Intellectual Science, Modern Languages, Drawing & Painting, Music, Elocution, Vocal Music, and Penmanship.

In 1850, Ancient Languages, Surveying, Instrumental Music, and Chemistry were added. In 1852, Book-keeping, Theoretical & Practical Surveying, and Pen Drawing were added, and a library was established.

1850–1900
Principal Sanborn (1850–1851) was very popular with the students, and the school thrived through its first couple of years with funding by generous patrons. After two years, Sanborn stepped down, and Moses Leland Morse of Bowdoin College took over for the next two years as principal. Under Morse, the student body more than doubled, as chemistry was added to the curriculum and the guaranty fund reached $3,000. Woodbury Langdon, Luther Puffer (law student), and John Simonds were some of the first graduates to go on to college. After Principal Morse stepped down, Thaddeus W. Bruce (1852–1853) of Dartmouth College took the helm with Miss Marcia Foster as assistant (which whom later married). Around this time future world-renowned artist David Dalhoff Neal also attended classes. George Dustan took over as principal in 1854 when the school fell victim to a smallpox outbreak, in which one of the teachers and a former student died.

The smallpox epidemic in 1854-1855 forced the school to close, and for the next three decades the school struggled with its identity and funding. In 1857, the school reopened its doors as the New England Christian Literary and Biblical Institute, then again in 1860 as the Andover Christian Institute. In 1865, the school was closed and reopened in Wolfeboro, New Hampshire, as the Wolfeboro Christian Institute.

As the school struggled, former Andover resident John Proctor, the inventor of the threaded wood screw, returned, in 1857, to build up the town. By the 1870s Proctor helped to return the school to Andover, debt-free, as well as build a new dormitory on the site of modern-day Gannett House. In 1879, the Unitarian Church sought to purchase the Andover school in order to create a school "free from...theological dogmatizing and unnatural religious methods." Andover was a hotbed of Unitarian thought, which helped to facilitate the sale of the school. In 1881, the school was opened as Proctor Academy in honor of John Proctor's contributions to the school.

The 1930s and 1940s

Not realizing the severity of the economic downturn, in 1932 the trustees of the school invested $45,000 to build Maxwell Savage Hall. At the first assembly of the 1935 school year, Headmaster Carl Wetherell announced that he was quitting due to the poor outlook for the school. A search for a replacement was hurriedly started. John Halsey Gulick took the job, and immediately instituted sweeping reforms of the school, creating mechanical arts programs such as boat building, wood shop, and machine shop. Students were involved in the upkeep and improvement of the school, clearing the land for the school's first ski area, Slalom Hill, as well as a farm which was used to feed the community. The school's wood shop and metal shop are still in use today for metalworking, boat building, and woodworking projects. The farm no longer exists, but the school still maintains a student-tended organic garden.

The 1950s and 1960s
Lyle Farrell—a 1929 graduate of the University of New Hampshire and captain of the 1928 Wildcats football team—who started teaching at Proctor in the 1930s, took over as Headmaster of the school in 1952. During his time as Headmaster, he pushed for the expansion of the school, leading to the construction of Holland Auditorium, Shirley Hall, Farrell Field House, Leonard Field, Farrell Field and the Blackwater Ski Area. Farrell also established the learning skills programs for college-bound students with dyslexia.

The 1970s to 1980s
In 1971, David Fowler succeeded Lyle Farrell as Headmaster. He instituted a democratic student government, rather than a seniority system. Realizing the unique location and programs that Proctor offered, they created a wilderness orientation program for new students, which still exists today. In 1974, the mountain classroom program was created, combining an Outward Bound type of small group outdoor experience with specialized academic sessions. By 1975, Proctor had faculty and facilities in Madrid, Spain, and Clermont-Ferrand, France, which led to later experiential education programs in Segovia, Spain, and Pont-l'Abbé, France. European Classroom, an art and French language program, was created in 2011, replacing the France program.

1990s to 2005
As Head of School from 1995 to 2005, Steve Wilkins challenged Proctor's faculty to study teaching methodologies and optimal learning environments. In 1998, the school initiated a capital campaign that raised more than thirty million dollars, resulting in expansion of facilities (Eco-dorm, Wise Community Center, Teddy Maloney '83 skating rink, Steve and Sarah Wilkins Meeting House), growth of endowment and increased faculty salaries. The role of the arts within the curriculum was advanced with a state-of-the-art music/recording facility, and the addition of voice, choral and dance programs.

2005 and beyond
As Head of School from 2005-2021, Mike Henriques advanced fiscal responsibility while promoting the quality of residential life on campus. A capital campaign entitled "Building Proctor's Future, Today" has resulted in extensive improvements to the Proctor Ski Area that include expanded snowmaking and alpine and Nordic trails that have received FIS homologation; three new dormitories; a new locker room facility; an outdoor athletic facility, including two turf fields and softball field; a net zero Dining Commons; and various campus "gateway" enhancements. Renovations to the Farrell Field House included new academic space, gymnasium, state of the art fitness center, and new locker rooms, while a new Outdoor Center opened in 2020 completing a full renovation of the west end of campus.

Extracurricular activities
Skills courses provide hands-on activities during the school day. These include jazz rock band, photography, metal engineering, blacksmithing, boat building, woodshop, ceramics, dance, theater, and many others. The theater department produces several major plays annually, including fall and spring straight plays and a winter musical.

Athletics
Proctor Academy fields teams in interscholastic competition in alpine skiing, crew (rowing), baseball, basketball, cycling, mountain biking, kayaking, cross-country running, cross-country skiing, dance, downhill skiing, field hockey, football, freestyle skiing, golf, hockey, horseback riding, ice hockey, lacrosse, Nordic skiing, ski jumping, snowboarding, soccer, softball, and tennis. The school belongs to the New England Preparatory School Athletic Council, which Proctor's women's ice hockey team won the championship of in 2012.

The school competes against Vermont Academy, Phillips Exeter Academy, Kimball Union Academy, Holderness School, Brewster Academy, New Hampton School and Tilton School, among others.

Campus

The property is a state-certified tree farm. Trees logged on the property are sold to generate revenue for the school, and some logs are used in the school's wood shop and to heat the wood-fired dorms in the winter. The school also operates its own sugar house and sells maple syrup which is made from sap gathered on the campus.

The campus is split in two parts by Andover's Main Street (NH Route 11 and U.S. Route 4), with academic buildings and dorms on one side and the Carr athletic fields and the Blackwater Ski Area on the other side of the road.

One of the newest additions to the campus, Peabody House, was completed in 2008 on the former site of Morton House, which was torn down in August 2007. The building was designed to follow LEED criteria and used recycled materials where possible.

Dorms
Proctor Academy has 19 dormitories that are either in use or are no longer in use:
Burbank East and West
Carr House (built 1870)
Carriage House/ Eco Dorm (built 1998)
Davis House (built 1978)
Elbow Pond Dorm
Farm House (built 1804)
Gannett House
Gulick House
Ives House
Johnson House (built 1978)
King House
Mackenzie House
Mary Lowell Stone House "MLS" (built 1870)
Peabody House (built 2008)
Rulon-Miller House
Sally B (built 2013)
Summerfield House (built 1978)
Thoreau House (burned in June 2016)
West End Dormitory

Notable buildings
 Proctor's net-zero ready Brown Dining Commons (built in 2016), the 'greenest' dining facility built at an independent school in New England, features 40 geothermal wells, rain gardens to collect run-off, solar panels, and high efficiency construction materials. 
Recording Studio (built 2006), state-of-the-art building-within-a-building designed to isolate the studio from any outside noise
Steve and Sarah Wilkins Meetinghouse (built 2001), theater and meetinghouse for all-school assemblies, also contains the dance studio, dressing rooms, black box, scene shop, and green room. 
The Cabin (built 1991), cabin located on the top of the hill behind Proctor's dorms, where students are allowed to stay for the night on the weekend
Yarrow's Lodge, ski lodge at the Blackwater Ski Area, base for the student ski patrol and the storage location for the school's snowcat

Notable alumni

Notable people who have attended the school include:

 Bob Beattie, '51 - former US Alpine Ski Team Head Coach and ABC television commentator
 Jerome Dyson, '06 - basketball player for Hapoel Jerusalem of the Israeli Premier League, 2012-13 top scorer in the Israel Basketball Premier League
 Peter Elbow - English professor, author of Writing without Teachers
 Nicholas Fairall, '07 - US Olympian 2014 Winter Games, US Ski Team, ski jumper
 John McVey -  singer/songwriter
 Matt Nathanson, '91 - singer/songwriter
 David Dalhoff Neal - artist, one of the first students in the early 1850s
 Robert Richardson, '73 - Oscar-winning cinematographer (Platoon, JFK, The Aviator, Kill Bill)
 Carl Van Loan, '98 - US Olympian, US Ski Team Nordic Combined, Large Hill team
 Cole Williams, '99 - television actor (Scrubs, 8 Simple Rules)

References

External links
 

Educational institutions established in 1848
Preparatory schools in New Hampshire
Private high schools in New Hampshire
Schools in Merrimack County, New Hampshire
Boarding schools in New Hampshire
Andover, New Hampshire
1848 establishments in the United States